Mill Hill is a historic neighborhood located within the city of Trenton in Mercer County, New Jersey, United States. It is considered to be part of Downtown Trenton. The Mill Hill Historic District was added to the National Register of Historic Places in 1977.

History
The name Mill Hill refers to central New Jersey's first industrial site, a mill, erected in 1679, at the southeast corner of the present Broad Street crossing of the Assunpink Creek. Mill Hill and its wooden mill were among the holdings of the first settler in the vicinity of Trenton, Mahlon Stacy, a Quaker who arrived in North America in 1678. The mill was destroyed in a flood.

Mill Hill became famous in the late 18th century for being the site of the Second Battle of Trenton, a battle many historians consider the turning point in the American Revolutionary War.  The battle took place on January 2, 1777, in what is now Mill Hill Park. Every year, this battle is re-enacted during Patriots Week in Trenton.
Mill Hill remained relatively undeveloped during the first decades of the 19th century. During this time it was not yet part of the City of Trenton. In 1840, the entire area was incorporated as South Trenton and then into the City of Trenton in 1851. The name Mill Hill was applied to the area at least as early as 1821.

Mill Hill grew rapidly during the 19th century as Trenton grew into an industrial center of some note. The Roebling steelworks made the wire cables used to construct most of the major bridges built in the United States, including the Golden Gate Bridge and George Washington Bridge. Trenton was also the principal center of the pottery and ceramic industry in the United States.  The Mercer Street Friends Center, a Quaker meeting house at 151 Mercer Street, was completed in 1858.

The population of Mill Hill swelled rapidly, enhanced by immigration. By 1920, 52% of the city's population was foreign-born.

During the Great Depression, Trenton started to decline. By 1953 Roebling Steel was one of Trenton's last great manufacturers to be sold to another company and then closed.

Since the early 1980s, Mill Hill has been undergoing a revitalization. This was enabled by a redevelopment plan that aims to convert Mill Hill into a latter-day "Georgetown". Instead of replacing the historical fabric of the area, the buildings were to be preserved and renovated. The red brick row-houses - constructed in the late 19th century - have been restored, in many cases being converted back to single-family homes (many had been converted to multi-family rental properties during less prosperous times). In a symbolic act that ended up carrying significant weight for the neighborhood, the then Mayor of Trenton, Arthur J. Holland, moved his family to 138 Mercer Street in 1964. "Mayor Arthur Holland and his young wife were idealistic newlyweds with a baby daughter in 1964 when they decided to restore a house in Trenton's crumbling, if historic, Mill Hill neighborhood." The restoration of the area has proceeded in waves ever since.

Initially focused on the 100 blocks of Mercer and Jackson Streets, some residents began renovating their homes. In 1967, the first Holiday House Tour took place. The tour became an annual event that continues today, attracting more than 1,000 people who tour the historic homes. With these changes came improving house prices, more investment and more restoration.

After the property collapse of the late 1980s, the second wave of renovation started. Commercial developers, led by Atlantis Historic Properties, took up renovating the vacant properties on the 200 blocks of Mercer, Jackson and Clay streets. Atlantis was formed by the members of the Mill Hill community themselves (in the early 1990s) to preserve and restore the historic homes - starting with the properties at 261 and 263 Jackson Street.

Today, renovated historic structures and historically sensitive new construction stand side by side.  The Quaker Meetinghouse on 151 Mercer is also home to the offices of Mercer Street Friends, a Quaker-affiliated social service agency serving Trenton and surrounding communities.

Historic district

The Mill Hill Historic District is a  historic district encompassing the neighborhood and roughly bounded by Clay, Jackson, Front, Market, Broad, and Greenwood Streets. It was added to the National Register of Historic Places on December 12, 1977, for its significance in architecture, commerce, and military history. The district includes 284 contributing buildings, two contributing structures, and one contributing object. The individually listed Douglass House and Mercer Street Friends Center contribute to the district. He is standing on a boat, symbolically representing his crossing of the Delaware River.

See also
National Register of Historic Places listings in Mercer County, New Jersey

References

External links
 
 Trenton Mill Hill
 

Neighborhoods in Trenton, New Jersey
Populated places established in 1679
1679 establishments in New Jersey